Vrbjani is a village in the municipality of Mavrovo and Rostuša, North Macedonia.

Demographics
Vrbjani (Verbjani) is recorded in the Ottoman defter of 1467 as a village in the ziamet of Reka which was under the authority of Karagöz Bey. The village had a total of 16 households and the anthroponymy attested depicts an almost exclusively Albanian character, with only a single case of Slavicisation in the case of Margjin Popivići:

Gjergj Luçi, Gjonëma Suma, Vasil Suma, Menka Gjeraqi, Vasko Luçi, Margjin Popivići, Mitri Shklavi, Llazar Kalja, Petër Skura, Pal Skura, Shoq Rusi, Kolë Kozani, Petër Reçi, Petër Kalja, Mile Gëraqi, and Tanush Gjeraqi.    

According to the 2002 census, the village had a total of 625 inhabitants. Ethnic groups in the village include:
Albanians 622
Others 3

As of the 2021 census, Vrbjani had 187 residents with the following ethnic composition:
Albanians 163
Persons for whom data are taken from administrative sources 24

References

Villages in Mavrovo and Rostuša Municipality
Albanian communities in North Macedonia